Sceloporus asper, the asperous spiny lizard, is a species of lizard in the family Phrynosomatidae. It is endemic to Mexico.

References

Sceloporus
Endemic reptiles of Mexico
Reptiles described in 1897
Taxa named by George Albert Boulenger